Mario Saccone (born August 28, 1970 in San Luis, Argentina) is an Argentine footballer currently playing for Sportivo Italiano of the Primera B Metropolitana in Argentina.

Teams
  Gimnasia y Esgrima de Mendoza 1993-1994
  Gimnasia y Esgrima de La Plata 1994-1996
  Coquimbo Unido 1997-1999
  Cobreloa 1999
  Juventud Unida Universitario 1999-2000
  Independiente Rivadavia 2000-2001
  Gimnasia y Esgrima de Jujuy 2001-2002
  Defensa y Justicia 2002
  Shandong Luneng 2003
  Defensa y Justicia 2004-2006
  Villa Mitre 2007
  Sportivo Italiano 2007–present

References
 Profile at BDFA 
 

1970 births
Living people
Argentine footballers
Argentine expatriate footballers
Club de Gimnasia y Esgrima La Plata footballers
Gimnasia y Esgrima de Mendoza footballers
Gimnasia y Esgrima de Jujuy footballers
Independiente Rivadavia footballers
Defensa y Justicia footballers
Sportivo Italiano footballers
Villa Mitre footballers
Coquimbo Unido footballers
Cobreloa footballers
Expatriate footballers in Chile
Expatriate footballers in China
Association football forwards
People from San Luis, Argentina